Acıbadem Mehmet Ali Aydınlar University (ACU) is a non-profit foundation university in Istanbul, Turkey, dedicated to the field of health sciences. The university was founded in 2007 by Mehmet Ali Aydınlar, an entrepreneur and founder of Acıbadem Healthcare Group, Turkey's leading healthcare institution.

As of 2019, ACU serves 4374 undergraduate and graduate students through School of Medicine, Faculty of Pharmacy, Faculty of Health Sciences, Faculty of Arts and Sciences, Faculty of Engineering, two Vocational Schools and four graduate schools;  Institute of Health Sciences, Institute of Social Sciences, Institute of Natural and Applied Sciences, and Institute of Senology.

ACU operates in a main campus and two affiliated hospitals (Acıbadem Maslak Hospital and Acıbadem Atakent Hospital) for education and research purposes. Kerem Aydınlar Campus, centrally located on the Asian side of Istanbul offers students a privileged university life.

Academics

Faculty and Departments
School of Medicine

Faculty of Pharmacy

Faculty of Health Sciences
Physiotherapy and Rehabilitation Department
Nursing Department
Health Management Department
Nutrition and Dietetics Department

Faculty of Arts and Sciences
Molecular Biology and Genetics Department
Psychology Department
Sociology Department

Faculty of Engineering
Medical Engineering Department

Institutes

 Institute of Health Sciences
 Institute of Natural and Applied Sciences
 Institute of Social Sciences

 Research Institute of Senology (RISA)

Vocational School of Health Services
Oral and Dental Health
Operating Room Services
Anaesthesia
Dialysis
Electroneurophysiology
First and Emergency Aid
Audiometry
Opticianry
Orthopedic Prosthetics and Orthotics
Pathology Laboratory Techniques
Podology
Radiotherapy
Medical Documentation and Secretarial
Medical Imaging Techniques
Medical Laboratory Techniques

Vocational School
Culinary
Biomedical Equipment Technology

See also
Acıbadem University School of Medicine
Acıbadem Healthcare Group

References

External links
 Acibadem University Homepage
 Acıbadem Healthcare Group

Universities and colleges in Istanbul
Educational institutions established in 2007
Private universities and colleges in Turkey
2007 establishments in Turkey